Luis Belmonte Bermúdez (c. 1598 – c. 1650) was a playwright of the Spanish Golden Age.

1590s births
1650s deaths
Spanish dramatists and playwrights
Spanish male dramatists and playwrights